Sicya is a genus of moths in the family Geometridae erected by Achille Guenée in 1857.

Species
Sicya crocearia Packard, 1873
Sicya macularia (Harris, 1850)
Sicya laetula Barnes & McDunnough, 1917
Sicya pergilvaria Barnes & McDunnough, 1917
Sicya morsicaria (Hulst, 1886)
Sicya olivata Barnes & McDunnough, 1916
Sicya medangula Dyar, 1918

References

Ourapterygini